Deceptive Bends is the fifth studio album by rock band 10cc, released in 1977.

History
The band started recording sessions for the fifth album in late summer of 1976 with the song "People in Love", at that time referred to as "Voodoo Boogie". But with the tensions in the band rising the track was considered "awful" when assembled, and Kevin Godley and Lol Creme decided to temporarily split with Eric Stewart and Graham Gouldman to start work on what would later become their debut project Consequences. As their work progressed Godley and Creme decided to leave the group.

As Stewart and Gouldman were left as a duo they opted to try recording "Good Morning Judge", which debuted live at the Knebworth Festival on 21 August 1976 with the original line-up, and later "The Things We Do For Love". Satisfied with the results they continued to run the band with the assistance of drummer Paul Burgess, who had already worked with 10cc, acting as second drummer to Kevin Godley on tour.

Stewart recalled: "I had a big challenge ahead of me to prove to the record world that we were not just 5cc, as some of the British media had graciously called us. The music was simpler than some of the previous 10cc albums, it was far more direct, streamlined and positive. The whole album was recorded very (in our terms) quickly. I was on a mission, and flying higher and faster than I had ever been before, and I knew by then that we had a very strong album. The new songs played a big part in the equation of course, I was out to prove also that we could write a hit album without Kevin and Lol ... we did!"

The album was the first by 10cc to be recorded in the newly built Strawberry Studios South, though the original recording attempts with Godley and Creme were made in the original Strawberry Studios now referred as North.

Cover and title 
The cover design was provided by Hipgnosis. The title of the album was taken from a sign warning of dangerous curves in the southbound A24 between Leatherhead and Dorking in Surrey. Gouldman said in 1977: "Every day I used to travel down from London and see the sign, 'Deceptive Bends.' It struck me to be quite a subtle word the Department of Transport was using, and Eric agreed it was a nice title." The sign is no longer there.

Release
The first single taken from the album, "The Things We Do for Love", reached No. 1 in Canada, No. 6 in the UK Singles Chart, No. 5 on the Billboard Hot 100 where it was later certified Gold and became the band's best selling single there.

Deceptive Bends itself was also a success, performing better than previous 10cc albums in a number of countries.

The album was reissued and remastered on CD in 1997 with b-sides as bonus tracks.

An early "Voodoo Boogie" version of "People in Love" that featured a more offbeat arrangement and prominent backing vocals by Creme, was later included in 10cc's limited-edition box set Tenology in 2012.

Track listing

All tracks written by Eric Stewart and Graham Gouldman.

Side one

Side two

Bonus tracks on 1997 CD reissue

Personnel

10cc
 Eric Stewart – lead and rhythm guitars, lead and backing vocals, keyboards, percussion
 Graham Gouldman – bass guitar, backing and lead vocals, rhythm guitars, lead guitar, organ, percussion, autoharp
 Paul Burgess – drums, percussion

Additional musicians
 Del Newman – string arrangements on "People in Love" and "Feel the Benefit"
 Jean Alain Roussel – electric piano and organ on "You've Got a Cold"
 Tony Spath – piano on "I Bought a Flat Guitar Tutor", oboe on "Modern Man Blues"

Charts performance

Weekly charts

Year-end charts

Certifications

References 

10cc albums
1977 albums
Albums with cover art by Hipgnosis
Mercury Records albums
Albums recorded at Strawberry Studios